The Jiger was the first all-terrain vehicle (ATV). It was a six-wheeled amphibious ATV with differential steering via separate throttle control of its dual (left vs right) engines. The first Jigers were built-to-order beginning in 1961 by JGR Gunsport in Toronto and were mass-produced by Jiger Corporation beginning in 1965. Production of the Jiger ended in 1968 due to the financial weakness of the company, despite strong demand.  Around 3337 Jigers were built.

The twin two-cycle "Techumseh Power Products" engines were replaced by a single four-cycle "JLO" engine. The dual engine system presented several problems. The first was keeping two engines timed at the same rpm on straight-line travel, which often required course correction. Secondly, maintaining two engines. Two-cycle engines tend to foul plugs, which had to be replaced often. A dual clutch/brake system was used to tie the two sides to the single power source.
The changes greatly improved product operation and dependability.

The Jiger was the brainchild of Jack (Jacob) Rempel (a.k.a. John Gower), the founder of JGR Gunsport, and Swiss engineer Fred Rohrer.

The Jiger was produced in three models:
 Build A – Twin-engine Techumseh (29 confirmed units built)
 Model 152 - Single-engine JLO 152 (1867 confirmed units built)
 Model 197 - Single-engine JLO 197 (959 confirmed units built)
Confirmation is based on existing serial numbers. Many serial numbers are still unconfirmed, so the actual quantity is more than what is recorded here.

References

Wheeled amphibious vehicles
ATVs
Six-wheeled vehicles